Menyhért Count Lónyay de Nagylónya et Vásárosnamény (6 January 1822, in Nagylónya – 3 November 1884, in Budapest) was a Hungarian politician who served as Prime Minister of Hungary from 1871 to 1872.

He was born to an aristocratic Protestant family, and studied law in Pest. He became a member of the Hungarian Diet in 1843, where he was a member of the opposition, though he also opposed the protectionist tariff system of Lajos Kossuth. He was undersecretary of state in the government brought to power by the Hungarian Revolution of 1848, and fled when the rebellion was put down in 1849. He returned to the country in 1850 with amnesty granted. After his return, he championed the construction works intended to provide navigation and flood control over the Tisza river and had an active role in launching projects in the agricultural and financial sectors. He protested in favor of the autonomy of Protestant churches after the Patent of 1859 endangered them.

He was appointed Minister of Finance under the first constitutional Prime Minister, Gyula Andrássy, in 1867, and in 1870 became the Minister of Finance of Austria-Hungary. In August 1871 he was raised to the rank of Count, and in November 1871 he became Prime Minister of Hungary.  He was driven off office relatively quickly, however, amidst accusations of corruption: He was accused directly by a member of the Diet on 18 November 1872, and was dismissed on 2 December of that year. He became a member of the upper chamber of the Diet in 1875, and died in 1884.

Ancestors

References
 

1822 births
1884 deaths
People from Szabolcs-Szatmár-Bereg County
Prime Ministers of Hungary
Hungarian Calvinist and Reformed Christians
Defence ministers of Hungary
Finance ministers of Hungary
Finance ministers of Austria-Hungary
Hungarian nobility
Members of the Hungarian Academy of Sciences
19th-century Hungarian politicians